The Pioneer and Military Memorial Park is the official name given to seven historic cemeteries in Phoenix, Arizona. The cemeteries were founded in 1884 in what was known as "Block 32". On February 1, 2007, "Block 32" was renamed Pioneer and Military Memorial Park. The Pioneer and Military Memorial Park is listed in the National Register of Historic Places. The historic Smurthwaite House, which is also listed in the National Register of Historic Places, is located on the grounds of the Pioneer and Military Memorial Park and is used as the cemetery's main office. Pioneer and Military Memorial Park is the final resting place of various notable pioneers of Arizona.

History
Prior to the establishment of the Pioneer and Military Memorial Park, there were other cemeteries already in existence as early as 1850. The citizens of the newly founded city became concerned with the "old" cemetery, which was once located between 5th and 7th Avenues and Jackson and Madison Streets, near a newly built train station. They feared that the sight of the "old" cemetery would be an unpleasant one to the railroad passengers who would visit the city in the newly established railroad system.

In 1884, the city counsel decided to purchase Block 32 in what archaeologists have now determined were the ruins of a pre-Columbian Hohokam community which they named "La Villa". The families who had their loved ones buried in the old cemetery, had them moved to the new one. The city also reburied the unclaimed bodies in a common grave in the new cemetery. On October 8, 1884, John R. Loosley became the owner of some of the western portion of "Block 32". He moved bodies from the potters field of the old cemetery and buried them in what became known as the "City" or "Loosley" cemetery. In 1888, Lulu G. Porter, wife of DeForest Porter, acquired the south half of Block 32 and had it laid out as a cemetery, which is now known as Porter cemetery.

The "Block 32" cemetery is made up of seven historic cemeteries which were in use between 1884 and 1914. Each of the seven cemeteries has its own name: the "Ancient Order of United Workmen" (AOUW), "Independent Order of Odd Fellows (IOOF)", "Knights of Pythias" (K of P), "Loosley" (also known as City Cemetery), "Masons", "Porter" and "Rosedale". In 1914, a law forbidding further burials within city limits went into effect and the seven cemeteries were declared closed. The cemeteries fell into a state of abandonment. After years of disrepair, the citizens of Phoenix rallied to restore the cemeteries. After the cemeteries were restored, they were officially designated, in May 1988, as the "Pioneer and Military Memorial Park". It is estimated that there are 3,700 burials; however, fewer than 600 of these graves have headstones.

The area which comprises the Pioneer and Military Memorial Park is bounded by 13th and 15th Avenues and Jackson and Harrison Streets. The main entrance is located at 1317 W. Jefferson Street.

In 1930, the Pioneers' Cemetery Association was founded. The association began the preservation and restoration of the cemeteries in the Pioneers and Military Memorial Park. They were also in charge of researching the history behind the burials. However, their work was interrupted by the death of Thomas Hayden, the prime researcher, and by World War II. The present Pioneers' Cemetery Association was formed in 1983 and has continued the work which was previously interrupted by the events previously mentioned. The association has a working relationship with the City of Phoenix.

The Smurthwaite House

The Smurthwaite House was designed and built in 1897 by Creighton & Millard, a local firm, for Dr. Darius M. Purman and his wife, Mary. The house, which was originally located at 602 N. 7th Street, was intended to be used as a boarding house. In 1903, the Purman's sold the house to National Bank of Arizona of Phoenix. That same year Captain Trustrim Connell, recipient of the Medal of Honor, and his wife Ann purchased the house. In 1938, it was deeded to their daughter Caroline who married Charles Smurthwaite. Later, the house was passed on to the Smurthwaite's daughter, Carolann Smurthwaite, who lived there until her death in 1982. Carolann had willed the house to be jointly administered by the Phoenix Art Museum, The Museum of Northern Arizona and the Heard Museum.

In 1991, the Heritage Fund approved a grant of $50,000 to restore the Smurthwaite House and in 1994, the house was moved to its current location at 1317 W. Jefferson Street. It currently serves as the office of the historic "Pioneer and Military Cemetery".

The "Bird's eye view of Phoenix, Maricopa Co., Arizona" map, created in 1885 by Czar James Dyer, is on display in the main room of the Smurthwaite House. In 1899, Dyer served as Phoenix's acting mayor.

National Register of Historic Places
The Smurthwaite House was listed in the National Register of Historic Places on May 17, 2001, NRHP reference number 01000479. Historic Significance: Architecture/Engineering; Area of Significance: Architecture. The Pioneer Military and Memorial Park was designated as historical and listed in the National Register of Historic Places on February 1, 2007, NRHP reference number 06001317. According to the National Register, the "Periods of Significance" are from 1850 to 1924.

Notable interments
Every year "Historic Cemetery Walking" tours, sponsored by the Pioneers’ Cemetery Association, are held. Among the notable burials included in the tours are the following:
  
  

 Judge John Taylor Alsap – Alsap was the first Treasurer of the Arizona Territory. He also served as both Speaker of the House and President of the Council in the Arizona Territorial legislature. In 1881, he became the first Mayor of Phoenix. Alsap died September 10, 1886.
 Phillip "Lord" Darrell Duppa – Duppa was an Englishman who is credited with naming "Phoenix" and "Tempe". He is also the founder of the town of New River, Arizona. Duppa died on January 29, 1892.

 Henry Garfias – Garfias  was a Hispanic who became the first marshal of Phoenix, Arizona. He was also a gunfighter who became the highest elected Mexican American official in the Valley during the 19th century.
 Jacob "Dutchman" Waltz – Waltz was a German immigrant who in the 19th century discovered a gold mine in Arizona and kept its location a secret, hence the name "Lost Dutchman's Mine". The Lost Dutchman Mine is supposedly located in the Superstition Mountains east of Phoenix. Waltz died an itinerant poor farmer on October 25, 1891, at age 81. According to the accounts of the day "A flood came through, he hung onto a tree, he caught pneumonia".
 King S. Woosley – Woosley founded one of the first flour mills in the Salt River Valley. He served in various positions in the territorial legislature and opened the first ice skating rink in Phoenix. Woosley died on June 30, 1879.

 Benjamin Joseph Franklin – Franklin was a Missouri U.S. Congressman and later served as U.S. Consul to China. He moved to Arizona in 1896. President Grover Cleveland appointed Franklin Arizona's 12th Territorial Governor. Franklin died on May 18, 1898.
 Czar James Dyer – Dyer once served as councilman and in 1899 as the acting mayor of Phoenix. Dyer drew the "Bird's Eye view of Phoenix" map which is currently on display in the Smurthwaite House. Dyer died on March 28, 1903.
 Noah M. Broadway – Broadway, who died on November 3, 1905, was one of the original settlers of Phoenix. He was an American Civil War veteran, farmer, and sheriff of Maricopa County. His farm was located between 7th and 23rd Avenues on the south side of what is now "Broadway Road".
 J.W. Bolton – Bolton was a barber who became the first African-American Mail carrier in Phoenix. Bolton died on December 26, 1902.
 Robert Plumridge – Plumridge served in the California Column of the Union Army and fought against the Confederate Forces in the Battle of Picacho Pass during the American Civil War.

 Clarence Proctor – Colton was a Buffalo Soldier who was a sergeant in Troop L of the 10th U.S. Cavalry during the Spanish–American War. On March 27, 1900, Proctor committed suicide.
 Millard Lee Raymond – Raymond served as a Rough Rider of Troop F 1st U.S. Volunteers Cavalry in Santa Fe, New Mexico. His  unit fought in the Spanish–American War in Cuba under the command of Theodore Roosevelt. Raymond died on January 11, 1899

 Frederick E. Tovrea – Tovrea was the 10-year-old son of E. A. Tovrea owner of the "Tovrea Land and Cattle Co." packing house and the "Tovrea Castle" in Phoenix. The child died on July 17, 1898, of appendicitis.
 John Preston Osborn – Osborn arrived in Prescott, Arizona in 1854. While he lived there, he built that town's first hotel. The hotel is also considered to be Arizona's first. Eventually he moved to the Salt River Valley and assisted in the establishment of Phoenix. Osborn died on January 19, 1900. Osborn Road in Phoenix is named after him.
 The Rossen Children – The children of Dr. Roland Rosson, whose house the historic Rosson House in Phoenix is listed in the National Register of Historic Places. Roland Lloyd Rosson died on February 25, 1883, and an "Infant Daughter" on January 7, 1896.
 William Augustus Hancock – Hancock laid out the first town site of Phoenix in 1870. Known as the "Father of Phoenix", he was appointed district attorney in 1871, probate judge in 1875 and was the first sheriff in Maricopa County. Hancock died on March 24, 1902.
 Tom Graham – Graham was the last man killed in the Pleasant Valley War. Ed Tewsbury ambushed Graham near the Buttes when he was traveling to Tempe with a load of grain.

 Lindley Orme – Orme, a former member of the Confederate Army of America, once served in the Territorial Council and later as Maricopa County sheriff. Orme died on September 24, 1900.
 Frank B. Moss – Moss was the Mayor, Fire Chief and Wagon Maker of Phoenix. He served two terms in office, the first in 1896 and the second 1905–06. He died at the age of 53 from a heart attack while serving as mayor, as he ascended the City Hall stairs.

Graves

See also

 Cave Creek Museum
 History of Phoenix, Arizona
 Children's Museum in Phoenix
 Martin Auto Museum
 Phoenix Historic Property Register
 List of historic properties in Phoenix, Arizona
 Adamsville A.O.U.W. Cemetery
 City of Mesa Cemetery
 Home Mission Cemetery
 Double Butte Cemetery
 Greenwood/Memory Lawn Mortuary & Cemetery
 Glendale Memorial Park Cemetery
 Goodyear Farms Historic Cemetery
 St. Francis Catholic Cemetery
 Historic Pinal Cemetery
Other historic Phoenix structures in Phoenix
 Squaw Peak Inn
 El Cid Castle
 Windsor Hotel
 Pioneer Living History Museum
 Phoenix Police Museum

References

External links

 Pioneer & Military Memorial Park – Pioneers' Cemetery Association, Inc.
 
 
 
 
 
 
 
 
 
 
 
 

Cemeteries in Arizona
History of Phoenix, Arizona
Cemeteries on the National Register of Historic Places in Arizona
National Register of Historic Places in Phoenix, Arizona
1884 establishments in Arizona Territory
Buildings and structures in Phoenix, Arizona
Geography of Phoenix, Arizona
Odd Fellows cemeteries in the United States
Cemeteries established in the 1880s